AvePoint is the largest independent software vendor of SaaS solutions to migrate, manage and protect data in Microsoft 365. AvePoint was founded in 2001 and is headquartered in Jersey City, New Jersey. The company also has offices and a strong footprint in the United States, Canada, Australia, South Africa, United Kingdom, France, Germany, Netherlands, Switzerland, Japan, Singapore, and China.

History

Early years: 20012014 
AvePoint was founded by Xunkai (Kai) Gong and Tianyi (TJ) Jiang after they coded the first AvePoint software in a public library in Somerset, New Jersey, in 2001. Jiang described that his experience in the north tower of the World Trade Center (1973–2001) during the September 11 attacks as a key catalyst driving him to become a software entrepreneur.

One of the company's key milestones was during a 2003 TechEd Microsoft conference session where SharePoint 2003 was unveiled for the first time. After receiving numerous audience questions about the company's inability to migrate their content to the new software, Jiang stood up and announced that DocAve was able to migrate to the new (at the time) platform.

The company was listed in the 2013 Deloitte Fast 500 of the fastest-growing companies in the world, and in Inc. magazine's 2014 "Inc. 500|5000" list of the fastest-growing companies in America.

In 2013, AvePoint's DocAve 6 product was named "Best of TechEd" and the company was named a finalist in three categories in the Microsoft Partner of the Year Awards: Collaboration and Content Partner of the Year, Office/SharePoint App Developer Partner of the Year, and Public Sector Partner of the Year – Public Safety/National Security.

In the 2014 Microsoft Partner of the Year Awards, AvePoint was named the winner of the Public Sector Partner of the Year  Public Safety/National Security category and was a finalist in the Office and SharePoint App Developer Partner of the Year category.

The company was backed by investors Goldman Sachs and Summit Partners, which acquired minority stakes in AvePoint in 2014 and 2007, respectively.

SaaS conversion and channel expansion: 20142020 
Starting in 2014, AvePoint made a major change to its technology and business models, converting its perpetual license model to a Software as a service model. After being initially challenged by the ongoing costs of the SaaS model and need to adjust partnerships and engagement models, AvePoint's cloud platform would expand across 14 global data centers, with quarterly releases, 24/7 support and ISO/IEC 27001 accreditation. Today AvePoint is one of the largest solution providers in the Microsoft 365 ecosystem, supporting more than 7 million cloud users, including a quarter of the Fortune 500.

In 2019, AvePoint expanded its support of Managed Service Providers and their small to medium sized customers via the channel with agreements with global distribution partners such as Ingram Micro, Synex Systems Corporation, Tech Data and others. The company aims to add 40,000 managed service provider partners by 2022.

In January, 2020 the company announced a $200 million Series C investment led by TPG Sixth Street Partners, with additional participation from prior investor Goldman Sachs and other unnamed investors. The round brought the total raised to $294 million to date.

Initial public merger announcement and De-SPACing: November 2020  July 2021 
In November 2020, AvePoint reached a deal to go public through a merger with blank-check company Apex Technology Acquisition Corp.(APXT). The transaction valued AvePoint at $2 billion and kept AvePoint co-founders Tianyi Jiang and Kai Gong as CEO and Executive Chairman respectively. The new company will be named AvePoint and will trade on the Nasdaq Stock Market under the symbol AVPT once the deal closes in the first quarter of 2021.

At the time of the announcement, AvePoint disclosed that it expects to generate approximately $148 million in total revenue for the year ending December 31, 2020, which would be an increase of approximately 26% over 2019 revenue. Out of more than 200 public software companies, AvePoint is one of 5 with annual revenue around $150 million, a growth rate of about 30% and positive EBIT margin of about 20%.

Life as a public company: July 2021  Present 
On July 2, AvePoint became a public company listed on the Nasdaq under the ticker AVPT. AvePoint received approximately $492 million in gross proceeds, consisting of Apex's $352 million of cash held in trust following de minimis public stockholder redemptions and $140 million from an ordinary share private investment in public equity (PIPE), excluding transaction fees. The PIPE was anchored by investors including but not limited to Federated Hermes Kaufman Small Cap Fund, Franklin Templeton, Phoenix Insurance Limited and Singapore-based global investor EDBI.

Products

SaaS solutions 
The AvePoint cloud is hosted on more than 14 data centers across the world in 4 different languages. Some of the SaaS solutions include:

 AvePoint Cloud Backup 

Supports unlimited cloud-to-cloud backup for Microsoft 365, Dynamics and Salesforce.

 AvePoint Cloud Governance 

Automates the provisioning, management, and lifecycle for Microsoft 365 workspaces including Teams, Sites and Groups.

 AvePoint Policies and Insights

Finds, prioritizes, fixes and enforces Microsoft 365 security controls.

 AvePoint Cloud Records 

Manages physical and electronic records in Microsoft 365.

 AvePoint EduTech

Provides education management systems directly integrated with Microsoft 365 for educational institutions and commercial businesses with training and accreditation needs.
 Curricula: A learning management system integrated directly with Microsoft 365 and Microsoft Teams that deepens collaboration and enables students to learn anytime, anywhere, on any device.
 Examena: An exam management system that uses facial recognition, AI anti-cheat systems and emergency offline mode along with other advanced technologies to ensure online exams are secure and fair. The solution also streamlines the exam process—from the logistics of arranging a testing venue to automated marking—for both online and physical exams.

Hosted solutions 

 AvePoint FLY 

It migrates from more than a dozen source environments including SharePoint, file shares, Box, Dropbox, and Microsoft 365 to target environments including Microsoft 365 Teams, Groups, Exchange, OneDrive, and SharePoint.

 AvePoint's DocAve Software Platform 

It is a governance and infrastructure management platform for SharePoint. The platform features products with migration, integration, management, optimization, protection, and reporting capabilities for SharePoint. .

 DocAve Governance Automation

First released in June 2012, It is a product for enforcing and creating governance policies for SharePoint through the enablement of service request management.

 AvePoint Compliance Guardian

It Provides protection against content leaks in Microsoft 365, Dropbox, Box, and about a dozen cloud services along with any misuse, through implementation of security settings, permissions, and tagging by assigning policy access rights and permissions to content in SharePoint and file shares.

 DocAve File Share Navigator

It is a SharePoint-based product for file sharing. It allows for retrieving of file share content through SharePoint without the need for migration. File Share Navigator allows file share content to be tagged, browsed, and previewed through SharePoint.

 AvePoint Meetings 

It is a Microsoft SharePoint application in which users can track notes, actions, and decisions made in meetings against agenda items.

 AvePoint Perimeter 

It is a product designed to help organizations establish governance and security policies so that they can enable workers remote access to Microsoft SharePoint content repositories from secure devices and locations.

 DocAve Cloud Connect 

It is a product designed to enable SharePoint Online and box.com users to synchronize, search, edit, and share all of the content stored in both repositories in one location.

Microsoft and other key partners 
AvePoint is a Microsoft Gold Certified Partner and five time Global Partner of the Year. The companies work together to maintain compatibility as new Microsoft 365 functionality is developed.

Additionally, AvePoint engages in original equipment manufacturer partnerships to leverage its technology through third-party software components.

References 

Companies listed on the Nasdaq
Software companies based in New Jersey
Software companies of the United States